Chuping may refer to:
Chuping
Chuping (state constituency), represented in the Perlis State Legislative Assembly